Oromocto (2016 population: 9,223) is a Canadian town in Sunbury County, New Brunswick.

The town's name is derived from the name of the Oromocto River; "oromocto" is thought to have originated from the Maliseet word welamukotuk which means "deep water". It appears on early maps as Ramouctou and La Rivière du Kamouctou (Freneuse seigneurial grant, 1684).

It is the administrative headquarters of the Oromocto First Nation band government and the site of Canadian Forces Base Gagetown, which dominates its economy and modern history.

On 1 January 2023, Oromocto annexed the local service district of the parish of Lincoln, excluding the Fredericton International Airport and a highway strip connecting it to the city. Revised census figures have not been released.

History

The town was initially an Acadian village. During the Expulsion of the Acadians, it was burned in the St. John River Campaign (1758). During the American Revolution, Fort Hughes was built in the community after the rebellion at Maugerville, New Brunswick. (A replica of Fort Hughes was built at Sir Douglas Hazen Park.) In 1783, Oromocto saw a large influx of settlers with the arrival of United Empire Loyalists, with a steady stream of new blood arriving in the area. Many of the Loyalists also moved into surrounding areas, establishing smaller communities such as Lincoln and Geary.

Oromocto was originally a shipbuilding town in the 19th century, but went into decline after the industry closed. During its shipbuilding days, Oromocto produced about 22 ships. This was made possible by an abundance of timber and sawmills, which continued to provide economic stability to Oromocto, even after the shipbuilding business had died out. It remained a small hamlet until it was selected as the headquarters for a large military training area, in the early 1950s. The Gagetown Military Camp (Camp Gagetown) opened in 1955 as the largest military reservation in the Commonwealth of Nations at the time.

Oromocto underwent a transformation during this time as it was designed to be a "model town". It was considered to be at the forefront of such efforts in Canada. Today, Oromocto's entire economy is dominated by CFB Gagetown.

The town's location in the Saint John River valley provides lush vegetation and an attractive waterfront on both rivers. A small park and marina occupy an area on the Oromocto River waterfront near the downtown. The nightlife attraction is Griffon's Pub and Eatery. The town's shopping mall features a Pizza Delight, Tim Hortons, Dollarama, Shoppers Drug Mart, Atlantic Superstore, and a barber shop. A business district in the area of Restigouche Road has become moderately successful, and the town features a small hospital, track and field facilities, and churches. The town is home to a distribution centre for Sobeys grocery stores, a funeral home, library and recreation centre. Where the town borders on CFB Gagetown, there is also a Canex with a salon and barbershop, hockey/squash arenas, swimming pool, and a credit union, along with military vehicles and aircraft on outdoor display.

Adjacent to the town on the eastern limits is the Oromocto First Nations reserve, a small Mi'kmaq/Maliseet community.

Canadian National Railway abandoned its railway line, which ran through the town to CFB Gagetown, in March 1996. This railway right-of-way has been developed as a recreational trail and is part of the "Sentier NB Trail" network. The section of the Sentier NB Trail between Fredericton-Oromocto-Burton also hosts the Trans Canada Trail.

Demographics 

Education
There are two school districts in Oromocto, one providing education in English and one in French, and eight public schools.
Anglophone West School District:
Assiniboine Avenue Elementary School
Gesner Street Elementary School
Hubbard Avenue Elementary School
Summerhill Street Elementary School
Harold Peterson Middle School
Ridgeview Middle School
Oromocto High School
District scolaire francophone Sud:
École Sainte-Anne, in Fredericton, serves Francophone high-school students from Oromocto.

Notable people

See also
List of communities in New Brunswick

References

External links
 Town of Oromocto

Communities in Sunbury County, New Brunswick
Towns in New Brunswick
Planned cities in Canada
Greater Fredericton